Dick Barrymore (October 21, 1933 in Los Angeles – August 1, 2008 in Ketchum, Idaho) was an American ski film maker of the 1960s and 1970s and an advocate of "hot dogging" (early freestyle skiing).

Films 

 Ski West, Young Man (1960)
 High Skis (1961)
 Some Like It Cold (1962)
 The White Search (1963)
 Winter Spell (1965)
 A Cool Breath of Fresh Air (1966)
 The Secret Race (1966)
 Last of the Ski Bums (1967)
 The Tenth Winter (1968)
 The Spider and the Frenchman (1969)
 Once in a Lifetime (1970)
 Here Come the K2 Skiers (1970)
 The Performers (1972) short
 Winter Heat (1973) short

 Day of Greatness (1974)
 Mountain High (1974)
 Assignment K2 (1975)
 White Horizons (1975)
 Blazing Skis (1976)
 High Cost of a Free Ride (1977)
 Wild Skis (1978)
 Vagabond Skiers (1979)
 Heli-Skiing (1979) short
 20 Years of Skiing (1980)
 A Bit of Madness (1981) short
 Canadian Mountain Odyssey (1981) short
 Scandinavian Ski Safari (1987) short
 The Golden Years of Ski Films (1997)

Books
  Memoir.

See also 
 Wet T-shirt contest—Barrymore held the first

References 

Lund, Morten (Nov 1969) "Dick Barrymore, we ask you--are you making it?" Ski Vol. 34, No. 3:150-8
Richey, Edward (2006) Living it Up in Aspen  pg 126
"Sun Valley in the '70s" The Ski Journal vol 6 #3 ISSN 1935-3219

External links 
  Obituary
 
 CMH Heli-Skiing title sequence on YouTube
 Hot dogging and Chamonix film clips at nuitdelaglisse.com

1933 births
2008 deaths
American documentary filmmakers
American male freestyle skiers